Dunblane and Bridge of Allan is one of the seven wards used to elect members of the Stirling Council. It elects four Councillors.

Councillors

Election results

2023 by-election
A by-election was held on 16 March 2023 following the death of SNP councillor Graham Houston in December 2022.

2022 election

2017 election
2017 Stirling Council election

2012 election
2012 Stirling Council election

2007 election
2007 Stirling Council election

References

Wards of Stirling
Dunblane